is the sixth single by Japanese entertainer Akina Nakamori. Written by Masao Urino and Haruomi Hosono, the single was released on September 7, 1983, by Warner Pioneer through the Reprise label. It was also the third single from her first greatest hits album Best Akina Memoires.

Background 
Nakamori performed the song on the 34th Kōhaku Uta Gassen, making her debut on NHK's New Year's Eve special. In 2010, she re-recorded the song for the pachinko machine .

Chart performance 
"Kinku" became Nakamori's third No. 1 on Oricon's weekly singles chart and sold over 511,000 copies.

Track listing

Charts

Cover versions 
 Pai Bing-bing covered the song on her 1984 album Zuìxīn dōngyáng jīnqǔ (最新東洋金曲). Her version is a mix of Taiwanese, Mandarin, and Japanese.
 Hong Kong singer Sara Lee covered the song in Cantonese as "Liàn'ài rèxiàn" (戀愛熱線, "Love Hotline") on her 1985 album Gàobié lǐlìruǐ (告別李麗蕊, Farewell to Li Lirui).
 Leslie Cheung covered the song in Cantonese as "Dì yī cì" (第一次, "The First Time") on his 1985 album Wèi nǎi zhōngqíng (為妳鍾情, My Love for You). He also covered it in Mandarin as "Bèiqì mìngyùn" (背棄命運, "Betrayal of Fate") on his 1986 Taiwan album Yīngxióng běnsè dāngnián qíng (英雄本色當年情, The True Nature of the Hero) and Mandarin-language Hong Kong album Àimù (愛慕, Love).
 Morio Agata covered the song on his 1993 cover album Imitation Gold.

References

External links 
 
 
 

1983 singles
1983 songs
Akina Nakamori songs
Japanese-language songs
Songs with lyrics by Masao Urino
Warner Music Japan singles
Reprise Records singles
Oricon Weekly number-one singles